Patrick Busolini (born 14 November 1954) is a former French racing cyclist. He rode in the 1979 and 1980 Tour de France.

References

External links
 

1954 births
Living people
French male cyclists
People from Chaumont, Haute-Marne
Sportspeople from Haute-Marne
Cyclists from Grand Est
20th-century French people
21st-century French people